President McKinley Inauguration Footage is the name given to two different short documentary films which were combined as one.  The two titles are President McKinley Taking the Oath and President McKinley and Escort Going to the Capitol. The two show President William McKinley arriving at the United States Capitol in order to take the oath of office for President of the United States as part of his second inauguration on March 4, 1901.

Both were produced by the Edison Manufacturing Company, under the direction of Thomas Edison , and in 2000 the United States Library of Congress deemed the two "culturally significant" and selected them for preservation in the National Film Registry.

Production 

Edison's crew shot the films on location on March 4, 1901 and released their footage less than two weeks later. The notes stated they had a camera and were "within twenty feet of the President's carriage when it passed," giving the general public an unprecedentedly intimate view of a United States President. The crew captured their images on several campers placed on rudimentary tripods that made it difficult to pan or tilt while filming.

Release 
Press accounts described the film receiving "great applause" and causing "pandemonium" during its screenings.

See also
Inauguration of the Australian Commonwealth, another early film (released January 1901) showing a national leader being sworn in.

References

External links
President McKinley Inauguration essay  by Charles "Buckey" Grimm at National Film Registry
President McKinley Taking the Oath, Library of Congress
President McKinley and Escort Going to the Capitol, Library of Congress

1901 films
United States National Film Registry films
Black-and-white documentary films
American silent short films
McKinley Inauguration Footage
American documentary films
Documentary films about American politicians
Thomas Edison
1900s documentary films
Presidency of William McKinley
Films shot in Washington, D.C.
American black-and-white films
1900s American films